is a Japanese professional golfer.

Morita plays on the LPGA of Japan Tour where she has won seven times. She won topped the tour's money list in 2013.

Professional wins

LPGA of Japan Tour wins (7)

Team appearances
Amateur
Espirito Santo Trophy (representing Japan): 2006

References

External links

Japanese female golfers
LPGA of Japan Tour golfers
Sportspeople from Kyoto
1990 births
Living people
21st-century Japanese women